Richard Tombs (born 5 January 1968) is a former Australian international rugby union player.

Tombs was born in Te Kuiti, New Zealand and educated at The Armidale School, NSW Australia. He toured Britain with the Australian schools side in 1985-1986 before establishing himself within the New South Wales Waratahs team and winning his international caps. He in total 5 international caps with Australia.

In 1997 he became one of the first three overseas professional players to join Gloucester Rugby in England, alongside Terry Fanolua and Philippe Saint-Andre. He remained at the club for three years, gaining a reputation for consistency; his centre partnership, with Fanolua, is still regarded as one of the club's best ever.

References

1968 births
Living people
Australian rugby union players
Australia international rugby union players
Sportspeople from Te Kūiti
Rugby union players from Waikato
Rugby union centres